75th Piket is a rural locality (a passing loop) in Zagorskoye Rural Settlement of Novokuznetsky District, Russia. The population was 6 as of 2010.

Streets 
 Dachnaya
 Nizhnyaya

Geography 
75th Piket is located 16 km west of Novokuznetsk (the district's administrative centre) by road. Rassvet is the nearest rural locality.

References 

Rural localities in Kemerovo Oblast